Ferenc Velkey or Velkei (November 15, 1915 – September 12, 2008) was a Hungarian basketball and field handball player, and sports administrator.

Velkey was born in Nagykáta on November 15, 1915. He played for the Hungarian national basketball team for many years, competing in three European Championships, including a third place finish in 1946. He retired from playing in 1949, after which he continued to be involved in the sport as an international referee and administrator. Away from basketball, he was a member of the Hungarian field handball team which finished fourth in the Olympic tournament in 1936.

Velkey died in Budapest on September 12, 2008, and was buried in Farkasréti Cemetery.

References

External links

1915 births
2008 deaths
Hungarian men's basketball players
Field handball players at the 1936 Summer Olympics
Hungarian male handball players
Olympic handball players of Hungary
Hungarian referees and umpires
Hungarian sports executives and administrators
Basketball executives
People from Nagykáta
Sportspeople from Pest County